Spencer James Cox (born July 11, 1975) is an American lawyer and politician serving as the 18th governor of Utah since 2021. A moderate member of the Republican Party, he served as the eighth lieutenant governor of Utah from 2013 to 2021.

Cox was raised and lives in Fairview, Utah. He was elected to the city council in 2004 and mayorship the next year. After overseeing rural economic development in Fairview, Cox was elected a county commissioner for Sanpete County in 2008. He was elected to the Utah House of Representatives in 2012.

In October 2013, Governor Gary Herbert selected Cox to replace Greg Bell as lieutenant governor; he was confirmed unanimously by the Utah State Senate. Cox was elected to the lieutenant governorship as Herbert's running mate in 2016. In 2020, after Herbert decided to retire, Cox sought the Republican nomination for governor. He defeated former governor Jon Huntsman Jr., former Utah GOP chair Thomas Wright, and former Utah House speaker Greg Hughes in the primary election and Democratic nominee Chris Peterson in the general election.

Cox has described himself as a "centrist, moderate, liberal Republican", a stance that has earned him critics on the Republican Party's right wing.

Early life and education
Cox was raised in Sanpete County; he graduated from North Sanpete High School. He enrolled at Snow College and completed a mission to Mexico for the Church of Jesus Christ of Latter-day Saints while he was a student. During that time, he married his high-school sweetheart, Abby, who also graduated from Snow College. After graduating with an associate's degree, he attended Utah State University (USU), where he obtained his bachelor's degree in political science and Abby obtained her degree in special education. At USU, Cox was named Student of the Year and graduated with a 4.0 grade point average.

Cox was then accepted to Harvard Law School, but chose to enroll at Washington and Lee University School of Law. He graduated with a Juris Doctor in 2001.

Career

Early legal work 
After law school, Cox was a law clerk for judge Ted Stewart of the United States District Court for the District of Utah. After his clerkship, Cox joined Fabian and Clendenin, a Salt Lake City law firm. He returned to rural Utah and became a vice president of Centracom.

Political career
Cox was elected as a city councilor of Fairview, Utah in 2004, and mayor the next year. In 2008, he was elected as a Sanpete County commissioner. Cox was elected to the Utah House of Representatives in 2012 and became the first member to call for the impeachment of John Swallow, the attorney general of Utah, over violations of campaign finance laws. Cox and Lieutenant Governor Bell served as co-chairs of Governor Herbert's Rural Partnership Board.

Lieutenant governor of Utah 
In October 2013, Herbert selected Cox to succeed Bell as lieutenant governor following Bell's resignation. The Utah Senate's Government Operations Confirmation Committee unanimously approved his nomination on October 15. The next day, the full Utah Senate confirmed him unanimously and he was sworn in. As lieutenant governor, Cox produced a report on Swallow's financial interests, demonstrating that Swallow had failed to properly disclose all of his income and business interests. Swallow resigned before the report's release.

In the 2016 Utah gubernatorial election, Cox was elected to a full term as lieutenant governor as Herbert's running mate.

Governor of Utah 

On May 14, 2019, after Herbert announced that he would not seek reelection, Cox announced his candidacy for the Republican nomination for governor of Utah in 2020. Cox won the Republican primary with 36.4% of the vote; former Governor Jon Huntsman Jr. received 34.6%. Cox defeated Chris Peterson, the Democratic Party nominee, in the November general election. In a break with tradition, Cox's January 4, 2021, inauguration (with precautions against the COVID-19 pandemic) was held at the Tuacahn Center for the Arts in Ivins, Utah, a small town in Washington County. The stated purpose of this move was to express Cox's desire to be governor for the entire state as opposed to focusing on the Wasatch Front region. Within days of his inauguration, he opened an office on Southern Utah University's Cedar City campus.

Cox said early on that increasing the speed of the state's vaccine distribution was his administration's top priority. Utah has administered more than 85% of the doses that it has received, according to CDC data.

In 2020, during the COVID-19 pandemic in Utah, Cox faced criticism for the state's decision to award millions of dollars in no-bid contracts in the early days of the crisis and for the controversial purchase of an anti-malaria drug as a possible treatment for COVID-19. Cox says he had no role in approving the $800,000 hydroxychloroquine order, which was later canceled.

In July 2022, Cox succeeded New Jersey Governor Phil Murphy as vice chair of the National Governors Association, as Murphy was elected the new chair.

Vetoes 
Cox has vetoed five bills as of 2022, all of which were Republican-backed (the Utah Legislature has a Republican super-majority).

Cox's first veto was of a bill sponsored by his brother-in-law, Senator Mike McKell, which sought to regulate the way social media platforms moderate content. Cox also vetoed Senate Bill 187: Local Education Agency Policies Amendments, sponsored by Ronald Winterton; Senate Bill 39: Hemp Regulation Amendments, sponsored by David Hinkins; and House Bill 98: Local Government Building Regulation Amendments, sponsored by Paul Ray.

In March 2022, Cox vetoed House Bill 11: Student Eligibility in Interscholastic Activities, sponsored by Kera Birkeland, which aimed to prevent transgender youth athletes from participating in women's sports. Cox noted that of Utah's 75,000 student athletes, only four were transgender and only one competed in women's sports. The legislature overrode his veto.

Political positions
Cox is frequently considered a centrist or liberal Republican. He has called himself a "centrist, moderate, liberal Republican", a stance that has earned him critics on the Republican Party's right wing.

In October 2015, Cox endorsed Marco Rubio in the 2016 Republican presidential primary. After Rubio withdrew, Cox endorsed Ted Cruz in March 2016. 

Cox said of Donald Trump's campaign, "We care a lot about decorum. We care about our neighbors. We are a good, kind people. He does not represent neither goodness nor kindness." He said he would not support Trump if he won the Republican nomination: "I think he's disingenuous. I think he's dangerous. I think he represents the worst of what our great country stands for... I won't vote for Hillary, but I won't vote for Trump, either."

Cox eventually changed course and said in 2020 that he supported Trump. But after the 2021 United States Capitol attack, Cox said that Trump was responsible for inciting the violence and called on him to resign.

Abortion 
Cox identifies himself as pro-life and opposes abortion except in the cases of rape, incest, or life of the mother.  

In May 2022, after the leaking of the draft opinion to overturn Roe v. Wade, Cox expressed support for the decision, but decried the leak, saying, "While we are encouraged and optimistic at the possibility that the abortion law will be left to the duly elected representatives of the states, draft rulings are not actual rulings and leaked drafts are a dangerous violation of court protocol and deliberations."

On June 24, 2022, Cox expressed his support for the overturning of Roe v. Wade and said: "This administration has been dedicated to giving a voice to the most vulnerable in our society, including the unborn. We wholeheartedly support this Supreme Court ruling and are encouraged to see abortion law will be left to elected state representatives. As pro-life advocates, this administration is equally committed to supporting women and families in Utah. We all need to do more to support mothers, pregnant women, and children facing poverty and trauma."

Guns 
In February 2021, Cox signed a constitutional carry bill to allow individuals to carry a firearm in public without a permit, making Utah the 17th state to do so.

In June 2022, Cox said in a press conference that he was open to discussing a red flag law with the legislature.

LGBT issues 

On June 13, 2016, Cox spoke at a vigil in Salt Lake City honoring those who died in the Orlando nightclub shooting the day before. He surprised many when he apologized for mistreating schoolmates and his lack of support for the LGBTQ community. He aimed part of his speech at the "straight community": Cox has further shown support for the LGBTQ+ community by supporting Governor Herbert's signing an executive order on January 21, 2020, to ban conversion therapy after a bill to do so died in the State Senate in May 2019. 

In an April 2021 town hall meeting, Cox announced his personal pronouns are "he", "him", and "his". 

In March 2022, Cox vetoed HB11, which would ban transgender youth from participating in high school sports, noting that only four trans kids were playing high school sports in the state at the time. "These kids, they're just trying to stay alive", he said, referring to studies showing that 56% of trans youth have attempted suicide. 

On June 1, 2022, Cox became the first Utah governor to recognize June as LGBTQ+ Pride Month when he issued an official proclamation and encouraged Utahans to "be more welcoming and accepting of the LGBTQ community". 

On January 28, 2023, Cox signed Senate Bill 16, which bans gender-affirming surgery for patients under 18.

Personal life
Cox is the oldest of eight children and grew up on a farm in Fairview. He and his wife, Abby, have four children, and reside on their family farm in Fairview. Cox's father, Eddie, served on the Utah Transportation Commission and was also a Sanpete County commissioner.

Cox plays bass guitar in a garage band. His brother-in-law, Travis Osmond, the son of Merrill Osmond, taught him to play bass. State Representative Mike McKell is also a brother-in-law. Cox's fourth cousin, Jon Cox, succeeded him in the Utah House of Representatives.

Electoral history

References

External links

Governor Spencer J. Cox government website 
Campaign website

|-

|-

|-

|-

|-

|-

1975 births
20th-century Mormon missionaries
21st-century American politicians
American bass guitarists
American Mormon missionaries in Mexico
Businesspeople from Utah
County commissioners in Utah
Republican Party governors of Utah
Latter Day Saints from Utah
Lieutenant Governors of Utah
Living people
Mayors of places in Utah
Republican Party members of the Utah House of Representatives
People from Mount Pleasant, Utah
People from Sanpete County, Utah
Snow College alumni
Utah city council members
Utah lawyers
Utah State University alumni
Washington and Lee University School of Law alumni